Jewish Babylonian Aramaic was the form of Middle Aramaic employed by writers in Lower Mesopotamia between the fourth and eleventh centuries. It is most commonly identified with the language of the Babylonian Talmud (which was completed in the seventh century) and of post-Talmudic (Gaonic) literature, which are the most important cultural products of Babylonian Jews. The most important epigraphic sources for the dialect are the hundreds of inscriptions on incantation bowls.

Classification and type

The language was closely related to other Eastern Aramaic dialects such as Mandaic. Its original pronunciation is uncertain, and has to be reconstructed with the help of these kindred dialects and of the reading tradition of the Yemenite Jews, and where available those of the Iraqi, Syrian and Egyptian Jews. The value of the Yemenite reading tradition has been challenged by Matthew Morgenstern. (The vocalized Aramaic texts with which Jews are familiar, from the Bible and the prayer book, are of limited usefulness for this purpose, as they are in different dialects.)

Talmudic Aramaic bears all the marks of being a specialist language of study and legal argumentation, like Law French, rather than a vernacular mother tongue, and continued in use for these purposes long after Judeo-Arabic had become the languages of daily life.

Like the other Judeo-Aramaic languages, it was written in the Hebrew alphabet.

Grammar

Pronouns

Independent nominative pronouns

Copulative pronouns

Genitive pronominal suffixes

Demonstrative pronoun

Accusative pronominal suffixes

Six major verbal patterns 
There are six major verb stems or verbal patterns (binyanim) in Jewish Babylonian Aramaic.  The form pe‘al (פְּעַל) “to do”, the form Aph'el (אַפְעֵל) “let do”, and the form Pa'el (פַּעֵל) “like to do”,  are all in the active voice. But the  form Itpe'el (אִתְפְּעֵל), the form Itaph'al (אִתַפְעַל) and the form Itpa'al (אִתְפַּעַל) are essentially reflexive and have usually  function in a passive sense.

Verbal pattern (binyan): pe‘al (פְּעַל) Basic Verb - Active 

 past tense 

  Participle

The Aramaic verb has two participles: an active participle with suffix and a passive participle with suffix:

 active participles with suffix

  

 passive participle with suffix

  infinitive /gerund

  

  Future tense

Verbal pattern (binyan):  Itpe'el   (אִתְפְּעֵל)  Basic Verb - Passive 

  past tense 

  future tense 
|}

Verbal pattern (binyan): pa‘el  (פַּעֵל) Frequentative - Active  
The verbal pattern (binyan) pa‘el  are frequentative verbs showing repeated or intense action.

The verbal pattern pa'el is Active  Frequentative.

  past tense

  future tense

Verbal pattern (binyan): Itpa'al  (אִתְפַּעַל) Frequentative - Passive   

The verbal pattern itpa'al is Passive  Frequentative.

Verbal pattern (binyan): aph‘el Causative - Active 

The verbal pattern aphel is Active  Causative.

 past tense

  Participle

  Future tense

Verbal pattern (binyan): itaphal (אִתַפְעַל)  Causative - Passive voice 

The verbal pattern itaphal is Passive  Causative.

Noun: singular/plural

List of verbs

Idiom

Modern study
The language has received considerable scholarly attention, as shown in the Bibliography below. However, the majority of those who are familiar with it, namely Orthodox Jewish students of Talmud, are given no systematic instruction in the language, and are expected to "sink or swim" in the course of Talmudic studies, with the help of some informal pointers showing similarities and differences with Hebrew.

See also
 Jewish Palestinian Aramaic

References

Bibliography
 Bar-Asher Siegal, Elitzur A., Introduction to the Grammar of Jewish Babylonian Aramaic, Münster: Ugarit-Verlag, 2013 
 J. N. Epstein, Diqduq Aramit Bavlit ("Grammar of Babylonian Aramaic"), 1960 (Hebrew)
 Frank, Yitzhak, Grammar for Gemara: An Introduction to Babylonian Aramaic: Jerusalem, Ariel Institute, 2000 
 Jastrow, Marcus, A Dictionary of the Targumim, the Talmud Babli and Yerushalmi, and the Midrashic Literature (reprinted many times) 
 Kara, Yehiel, Babylonian Aramaic in the Yemenite Manuscripts of the Talmud: Orthography, Phonology and Morphology of the Verb: Jerusalem 1983
 Klein, Hyman, An Introduction to the Aramaic of the Babylonian Talmud: London 1943
 Kutscher, Eduard Yechezkel, Hebrew and Aramaic Studies, ed. Z. Ben-Hayyim, A. Dotan, and G. Sarfatti: Jerusalem, The Magnes Press / The Hebrew University, 1977
 Levias, Caspar, A grammar of the Aramaic idiom contained in the Babylonian Talmud: 1900 (reprints available)
 Marcus, David, A Manual of Babylonian Jewish Aramaic: University Press of America, Paperback 
 Margolis, Max Leopold, A manual of the Aramaic language of the Babylonian Talmud; grammar chrestomathy & glossaries: Munich 1910 (reprints available)
 Melamed, Ezra Zion, Dictionary of the Babylonian Talmud, Feldheim 2005 
 (in Hebrew)

Languages attested from the 4th century
Languages extinct in the 11th century
Eastern Aramaic languages
History of Mesopotamia
Jewish languages
Judeo-Aramaic languages
Extinct languages of Asia
Languages of Iraq
Sacred languages